German Lake may refer to:

German Lake (Isanti County, Minnesota)
German Lake (Le Sueur County, Minnesota)
German Lake (Otter Tail County, Minnesota)

See also
List of lakes of Germany